Özlem Yılmaz (born 17 July 1986) is a Turkish actress.

Born and raised in Istanbul, Yılmaz's family is from Rize. She started her education at Kartaltepe Primary School and later studied at Ataköy Republic High School. She then enrolled in Kültür College. After finishing her studies, she decided to pursue a career in acting. Besides taking acting classes, she was trained by Müşfik Kenter but was forced to take a break due to her father's death. A year later she continued her studies at the Müjdat Gezen Art School and in 2006 graduated from Müjdat Gezen Actor Studio.

Yımaz started her television career in 2006 and made her cinematic debut in 2013 with a role in Kudret Sabancı's movie Karaoğlan. She is best known for her roles in series such as Unutulmaz, Kaçak, and Kara Ekmek.

Filmography

References

External links 
 
 

1986 births
Turkish television actresses
Turkish film actresses
Actresses from Istanbul
Living people